The 1968 Hardie-Ferodo 500 was a production car race held on 6 October 1968 at the Mount Panorama Circuit just outside Bathurst in New South Wales, Australia. It was the ninth running of the Bathurst 500.

For the first time factory supported teams of Ford and Holden V8s raced against each other, setting a pattern that continued in Australian racing into the 21st century. It was not one of the factory cars that won however. The race was won by the Wyong Motors entered Holden Monaro driven by Bruce McPhee (apart from one lap mid-race driven by Barry Mulholland) who defeated the big teams with a tactical strategy of running a buffed hard wearing street tyre rather than a racing tyre. Initially Des West and Ron Marks were classified second but were later disqualified for illegal engine modifications. Second place was then awarded to the factory supported Holden Dealer Racing Team Holden Monaro of Jim Palmer (to that point the best finish by a New Zealander) and Phil West. The AM Roberts entered Holden Monaro driven by Tony Roberts and Bob Watson finished third.

Future two-time Bathurst 1000 winner Allan Grice made his Mount Panorama debut in 1968. Driving with author Bill Tuckey in a Class D Fiat 124 Sport for Scuderia Veloce, the pair finished the race in 18th outright and 9th in class, 11 laps down on the McPhee/Mulholland Monaro.

Midge Whiteman and Christine Cole, driving in a Morris Mini De Luxe, contested the race as an all female duo, placing fifth in their class.

Class structure
Cars competed in five classes based on the purchase price (in Australian dollars) of the vehicle.

Class A
Class A was for cars which cost up to $1,850. It was contested by Datsun 1000, Ford Cortina, Hillman GT, Morris Mini De Luxe and Toyota Corolla.

Class B
The $1,851 to $2,250 class entries were dominated by the Datsun 1600, but also included Hillman Arrow, Hillman Gazelle and Morris 1100S.

Class C
The $2,251 to $3,000 class was contested by Ford Falcon, Holden Kingswood, Fiat 125 and Morris Cooper S.

Class D
The $3,001 to $4,500 class featured the outright contenders, Ford Falcon GT and Holden Monaro GTS 327, and also included single entries of Chrysler VE Valiant, Fiat 124 Sport and Studebaker Lark.

Class E
For cars over $4,500, the class was contested by Alfa Romeo 1750 GTVs and a single Citroen DS21 Pallas.

Top 10 Qualifiers

Results

Note : Jack Nougher competed in car 44 under the name "Jack Eiffeltower" in this race.

Statistics
 Pole Position – No.13 Bruce McPhee – 2:56.7
 Fastest Lap – No.13 Bruce McPhee – 2:58 (lap record)
 Average Speed – 119 km/h
 Race time of winning car – 6:44:07

References 

 

 Bill Tuckey, Australia's Greatest Motor Race, 1981, pages 130-137

 Racing Car News, November 1968, pages 24–32

External links
 CAMS Manual reference to Australian titles
 race results

Motorsport in Bathurst, New South Wales
Hardie-Ferodo 500